The Drachen Studio Kecur EOS 15 is a German double-surface ultralight trike wing, designed and produced by Drachen Studio Kecur of Mettmann.

The wing is used on their own Drachen Studio Kecur Royal 912 line of trikes as well as by other ultralight aircraft manufacturers.

Design and development
The wing is a cable-braced, king post-equipped hang glider-style wing designed as touring wing for two-place trikes.

The wing is made from bolted-together aluminum tubing, with its double surface wing covered in Dacron sailcloth. The wing's crosstube is enclosed in the double surface. Its  span wing uses an "A" frame weight-shift control bar and is equipped with spoilers.

Applications
Drachen Studio Kecur Royal 912

Specifications (EOS 15)

References

External links

Photo of EOS 15

Ultralight trike wings